Pedro Domingos Agostinho (born 30 July 2000) is an Angolan footballer who currently plays as a midfielder for Petro Luanda.

Career statistics

Club

Notes

International

References

2000 births
Living people
Angolan footballers
Angola international footballers
Association football midfielders
Atlético Petróleos de Luanda players
Girabola players